The Scarlet Letter is a 1995 American romantic drama western film directed by Roland Joffé. "Freely" adapted from Nathaniel Hawthorne's 1850 novel of the same name, it stars Demi Moore, Gary Oldman, and Robert Duvall. The film met with overwhelmingly negative reviews. It was nominated for seven Golden Raspberry Awards, winning "Worst Remake or Sequel", and has garnered a legacy as one of the worst films ever made.

Plot
It is 1667 in the Massachusetts Bay Colony, and an uneasy truce exists between local Puritans and their neighbors, the Algonquian. Chief Metacomet succeeds his father Massasoit as head of the latter just as a new colonist, Hester Prynne arrives overseas from England. As Hester waits for her husband—who is due to follow shortly after—she falls for a young minister, Arthur Dimmesdale. When it emerges that Roger Prynne has likely been killed by Native Americans, they become inseparable lovers.

Finding herself pregnant with Dimmesdale's child, Hester is imprisoned for her indiscretion. The minister intends to declare his sin and face execution, but Hester convinces him otherwise. Sentenced to wear a scarlet "A" for adultery, Prynne is ostracized by the public, and a drummer boy is charged to follow her whenever she comes to town. Meanwhile, Hester's husband resurfaces, having spent his absence in captivity as a prisoner of war. Learning of the scandal, he adopts the fictitious guise of "Dr. Roger Chillingworth" and begins seeking out her paramour.

The physician eventually murders a male settler leaving Hester's home and scalps him in an effort to implicate Algonquian warriors. Infuriated by this atrocity, the colonists declare war on the Indians and Roger, distraught by the severe consequences of his action, promptly commits suicide. Hester is nearly hanged with other undesirables in the ensuing outrage, but Dimmesdale saves her neck by confessing that he is the father of her child. As he takes her place on the gallows, the Algonquian attack Massachusetts Bay; both sides sustain heavy casualties. The Puritans are more concerned with concealing the conflict from England than harassing Hester any further; she finally abandons her scarlet letter and departs with Dimmesdale for Carolina.

Cast

Production

The film was shot in British Columbia on Vancouver Island, in and around Campbell River (Beaverlodge Lands—now Rockland Road and North Island College/Timberline Secondary, Lupin Falls and Myra Falls in Strathcona Provincial Park, Little Oyster River, and White River), and in the Nova Scotia towns of Yarmouth, Shelburne, and in the small village of Saint Alphonse in Clare in 1994. In Shelburne, the waterfront area was substantially altered to resemble a Puritan New England town in the mid-17th century. Some of the buildings on Dock Street retain the grey-tone paint finishes used for the film.

Score
Two original scores were written for this film. Ennio Morricone provided some early demos based on his prior work with Joffé on The Mission, but nothing original was recorded with an orchestra. A rejected score was composed by Elmer Bernstein, but his music was set aside in lieu of the final score, composed by John Barry. Reportedly, star Demi Moore wanted a score by Barry from the start (based on the composer's work on Indecent Proposal), so Bernstein's music was not going to be accepted, regardless of quality.

Barry's score was released on CD by Sony Records upon the film's release in 1995. A CD of Bernstein's rejected score was released by Varèse Sarabande in 2008.

Reception
The Scarlet Letter met with overwhelmingly negative reviews. Washington Post writer Amy E. Schwartz observed the critical reaction to the "nutty" film: "Phrases like 'unintentionally funny' and 'unwittingly hilarious' have gotten a considerable workout, along with variations on the judgment pronounced by the woman who was two seats away... and who, when the lights went up, cried, 'That's got to be the worst movie I've ever seen'." More forgiving was Peter Stack of the San Francisco Chronicle, who found it to be a "well-acted, beautiful movie", despite the "syrupy orchestral score" and "big liberties taken with Hawthorne's story".

Multiple critics named the film the worst of 1995; Deseret News writer Chris Hicks argued that its deviation from the source material represents "Hollywood's arrogance in its purest form". It won Worst Remake or Sequel at the 1995 Golden Raspberry Awards, receiving further nominations for Worst Actress (Moore), Worst Supporting Actor (Duvall), Worst Screen Couple (Moore and either Duvall or Oldman), Worst Director, Worst Picture, and Worst Screenplay. Audiences surveyed by CinemaScore gave The Scarlet Letter a grade of "B" on a scale of A+ to F, but the film was not successful at the box office, grossing $35 million against a production budget of $46 million.

In a retrospective article, Kevin Williamson of National Review observed a "combination of awfulness and inexplicability", and claimed that "any objective and authoritative analysis will reveal that the worst film ever made is Demi Moore's version of The Scarlet Letter". Bustles Sadie Trombetta wrote that the film "has earned an almost permanent spot on every 'Worst Movie of All Time' list", while author Libby Fischer Hellmann noted that it is "widely cited as the worst film adaptation ever made". Film4 offered scant praise, calling it "dodgy but oddly entertaining". Based on 38 reviews collected by aggregator Rotten Tomatoes, the film holds a 13% approval rating, with an average score of 3.4/10. The site's critical consensus reads, "The Scarlet Letter strays far from its classic source material to tell a story that strains for steamy sensuality and leaves the audience red with unintentional laughter."

In response to the criticism, and to the modified narrative, Moore said that the story the filmmakers were trying to tell differed out of necessity since the book "is very dense and not cinematic". She noted the original story might be better suited to a miniseries on television, and that the story presented in this film needed a different ending, one that did not lose "the ultimate message of Hester Prynne" that its makers were trying to convey. Asked by critic Peter Travers in 2011 to name the few films in his catalogue that he would take to a desert island, Oldman named The Scarlet Letter among his four choices. He conceded Travers's assertion that the film was "hammered" by reviewers, but argued, "There's some good work in there."

See also
List of films considered the worst
The Scarlet Letter – the original novel by Nathaniel Hawthorne

References
Notes

Citations

External links
 
 
 
 San Francisco Chronicle review
 Reading Hawthorne in a gender-biased academy (refers to this film version)

1995 films
1995 romantic drama films
American romantic drama films
American Western (genre) films
1995 Western (genre) films
Films directed by Roland Joffé
Films based on The Scarlet Letter
Films produced by Andrew G. Vajna
Films shot in Nova Scotia
Films shot in Vancouver
Cinergi Pictures films
Hollywood Pictures films
Films scored by John Barry (composer)
Films with screenplays by Douglas Day Stewart
Golden Raspberry Award winning films
1990s English-language films
1990s American films